Capparis elegans is a flowering plant species in the genus Capparis found in Brazil.

References

External links

elegans
Plants described in 1839
Flora of Brazil